Andrés García (born 18 July 1967) is a Spanish fencer. He competed in the foil events at the 1988 and 1992 Summer Olympics.

References

External links
 

1967 births
Living people
Spanish male foil fencers
Olympic fencers of Spain
Fencers at the 1988 Summer Olympics
Fencers at the 1992 Summer Olympics
Sportspeople from León, Spain